Loop is a 1997 British romantic comedy feature film produced by Tedi De Toledo and Michael Riley. It was written by Tim Pears and is the debut film of director Allan Niblo.

The writer of Loop, Tim Pears, also wrote the novel for In a Land of Plenty which was turned into an acclaimed 10-part TV drama serial for the BBC and produced by the London-based production company Sterling Pictures and Talkback Productions.

Plot
The main character, Rachel, is dumped by her boyfriend and exacts revenge. This film is classified as a romantic comedy.

Cast
 Andy Serkis as Bill
 Susannah York as Olivia
 Tony Selby as Tom
 Moya Brady as Waitress
 Willie Ross as Geordie Trucker
 Heather Craney ...  Cashier
 Howard Lee ...  Bank Clerk
 Paul Ryan ...  City Barman
 Emer McCourt as Rachel
 Jayne Ashbourne as Hannah
 Gideon Turner as Jason
 Alisa Bosschaert as Sarah
 Paul Daly a Jack
 Evelyn Doggart as Jean
 Emer McCourt as Rachel
 Maya Saxton as Jenny
 Gideon Turneras Jason

Reception
Contemporary British and Irish Film Directors: a Wallflower Critical Guide, panned the film, calling it a formulaic romantic comedy that was "obviously" filmed on a very small budget.  The review makes note of problems with cinematography, sound, script, and direction, summarizing "Loop reminds you that good films are increasingly hard to make, and with countless projects languishing in development or distribution hell, it is difficult to see how this ever made it to the production line."

References

External links
Loop at the Internet Movie Database

British romantic comedy films
1997 films
Sterling Pictures films
1997 romantic comedy films
1990s English-language films
1990s British films